Reginald Ashley Caton (1897–1971) was an English publisher. He appears as a literary character, especially in novels by Kingsley Amis.

In 1924 he founded the Fortune Press in London, initially as a small press specialising in gay erotica. Such was his admiration for the Nonesuch Press’s 1924 translation of Plato’s Symposium, however, that he published an almost exact copy of it. Nonesuch immediately threatened legal action, calling Caton and the Fortune Press “thieves and pirates”.

In 1934 Caton was prosecuted for obscene libel, found guilty and ordered to pulp the offending books, although these editions could still be found on sale in the 1970s. Some of his titles have been described as mild homosexual porn and even "rank sodomy". It has even been suggested that Fortune Press was the closest thing that Britain had to a gay publishing house, until the establishment of the Gay Men's Press in the 1970s. But the main result of the obscenity trial was a swift shift in focus from porn to poetry. Caton himself referred to the trial as "no joke".

In the end, according to the standard bibliography, Caton had published 600 books, from his publishing office at 21 Belgrave Road in London, perhaps outgrowing the adjective 'small'. Many of these are of literary interest, produced by the circumstance that paper was in short supply as soon as World War II started; and Fortune Press had hoarded stocks. Much of the regular magazine publishing of poetry, in particular, had to shut down.

Caton is celebrated for obtaining the rights to Dylan Thomas's 18 Poems, which he published in 1934, with repercussions for the poet. During the war years he first rejected Philip Larkin's first novel Jill (for obscenity), but finally published it in 1946, as he did his poetry collection, The North Ship. No manuscript version of Jill has survived.

Caton also published, for example, Nicholas Moore, and Wrenne Jarman. Experts have concluded that there was no literary, rather than business, consistency. In 1951 he published Bryan Magee's first book, an anthology of poems entitled Crucifixion and Other Poems.

The Fortune Press was sold to Leonard Holdsworth, of The Charles Skilton Publishing Group.

References

R. A. Caton and the Fortune Press. A Memoir and a Hand-List (1983) Timothy D'Arch Smith

British book publishers (people)
1897 births
1971 deaths